Pavel Čermák (born 14 May 1989) is a professional Czech football player.

References
 
 
 Guardian Football

Czech footballers
Czech expatriate footballers
1989 births
Living people
Czech First League players
FK Baník Most players
FK Viktoria Žižkov players
FC Hradec Králové players
FK Senica players
Slovak Super Liga players
Expatriate footballers in Slovakia
Czech expatriate sportspeople in Slovakia
Association football defenders